Odo I (also spelled Eudes) ( – 12 March 996), Count of Blois, Chartres, Reims, Provins, Châteaudun, and Omois, was the son of Theobald I of Blois and Luitgard, daughter of Herbert II of Vermandois. He received the title of count palatine, which was traditional in his family, from King Lothair of West Francia.

Like his relations, the counts of Vermandois, he remained faithful to the Carolingians against the Capetians. Following the war between his father and Odalric, Archbishop of Reims, over the castle of Coucy, he received the castle to hold it from the archbishop.

In the 970s, in the wars for control of Brittany, he subjugated the county of Rennes and Count Conan I affirmed the rights of his family in the region. Around 977, his father died and he succeeded in the counties his father held at the time of his death.

In 987, Odo supported Charles of Lorraine against Hugh Capet. In June 991, he took Melun. Hugh Capet, Bouchard of Vendome, Richard I of Normandy and Fulk Nerra, assembled against him and retook Melun in late 991.

Near 995, he entered into a war against Fulk, who was already at war with Geoffrey I of Brittany. Odo allied with his brother-in-law William IV of Aquitaine and Baldwin IV of Flanders. Even his old enemy, Richard of Normandy joined in the war on Fulk. In the winter of 995 – 996, they besieged Langeais, however Odo became ill and was taken to the monastery of Marmoutier at Tours where he died on 12 March 996.

Family
He married Bertha of Burgundy, daughter of King Conrad of Burgundy and Matilda of France. Their children were:
Robert (died between 980 and 996)
Theobald II (c. 982–1004)
Odo II (c. 983–1037)
Thierry (died 996)
Agnes, married Viscount Geoffrey II of Thouars
Roger (died 1022)

References

Sources

Counts of Blois
Counts of Chartres
Counts of Châteaudun
Counts of Tours
Counts of Reims
Counts of Provins
Counts of Omois

House of Blois

10th-century French people

950s births
996 deaths

Year of birth uncertain